The 2012 Greater Western Sydney Giants season was the club's first season of senior competition in the Australian Football League (AFL). The club also fielded its reserves team in the North East Australian Football League (NEAFL) for its second season, but under the new name University of Western Sydney Giants.

Club personnel
Kevin Sheedy was the first head coach of the Giants, while Mark Williams was the assistant coach.

Playing list

 Playing statistics

*= Player made his debut at a club other than Greater Western Sydney.

All statistics taken from AFL.com.au

Season summary

Pre-season matches

Regular season

Ladder

NEAFL season

Squad

Results

References

External links
 Official website of the Greater Western Sydney Giants

2012
Geater Western Sydney Football Club